The women's 100 metre butterfly event at the 2000 Summer Olympics took place on 16–17 September at the Sydney International Aquatic Centre in Sydney, Australia.

Dutch rising star Inge de Bruijn shattered her own world record by 0.03 seconds to claim the gold medal in the event. Forging a narrow lead at the initial turn, she cruised her path on the final lap to hit the wall first in a sterling time of 56.61. Slovakia's Martina Moravcová moved herself up from fourth to surge past the field for the silver medal in 57.97. At only 33 years of age and competing in her fourth Olympics since 1984, U.S. legend Dara Torres ended her seven-year retirement from the sport by taking home the bronze in 58.20.

Australia's top favorite Petria Thomas failed to impress the home crowd with her fourth-place effort, finishing off the podium by 29-hundredths of a second in 58.49. Trailing behind De Bruijn by 0.12 seconds, Jenny Thompson faded down the final stretch to pick up a fifth spot in 58.73. Earlier in the prelims, she posted a leading time (57.66) to cut off Qian Hong's 1992 Olympic record by almost a full second. Japan's Junko Onishi (59.13), Thomas' teammate Susie O'Neill (59.27), competing in her third Olympics, and Romania's Diana Mocanu (59.43) rounded out the finale.

Before her breakthrough final, De Bruijn erased Thompson's record from heat five by 0.06 seconds to post a top-seeded time of 57.60 in the prelims. Followed by an evening session on the first night of the Games, she eventually lowered it to 57.14 in the semifinals.

Records
Prior to this competition, the existing world and Olympic records were as follows.

The following new world and Olympic records were set during this competition.

Results

Heats

Semifinals

Semifinal 1

Semifinal 2

Final

References

External links
Official Olympic Report

B
Women's 100 metre butterfly
2000 in women's swimming
Women's events at the 2000 Summer Olympics